USS Kerkenna was a United States Navy cargo ship in commission from 1918 to 1919.

Construction, early career, acquisition, and commissioning
Kerkenna was launched on 25 July 1900 at Port Glasgow, Scotland, by William Hamilton and Company as the commercial cargo ship Borneo, and was delivered to her owners later that year. Later renamed Kerkenna, she was the property of the Kerr Navigation Company of New York City when the United States Army took control of her on 22 November 1917 for World War I service. The U.S. Navy acquired her at Brest, France, on 28 September 1918 and commissioned her the same day as USS Kerkenna.

Unlike most commercial ships commissioned into U.S. Navy service during World War I, Kerkenna never received a naval registry Identification Number (Id. No.).

United States Navy service
Attached to the Naval Overseas Transportation Service, Kerkenna carried coal and U.S. Army supplies between British and French ports until 24 February 1919.

Kerkenna departed Inverness, Scotland, on 24 February 1919 with a cargo of naval mines and naval mine supplies for return to the United States. Reaching New York City on 19 March 1919, she departed on 21 March 1919 for Norfolk, Virginia, where she arrived on 24 March 1919. She then was decommissioned on 16 April 1919 and transferred to the United States Shipping Board for immediate return to the Kerr Navigation Company.

Later career
Kerkenna returned to commercial service. In 1921, Kerr Navigation sold her to the American Ship and Commerce Navigation Corporation, which renamed her Mount Summit. She was sold again in 1922 to the Oceana Sea Navigation Company of Budapest, Hungary, and renamed Alfold. In 1925, she was sold to George F. Andreadis of Chios, Greece, and renamed Doris. She was sold in 1929 to Turkish owners and renamed Ikbal. Her long career came to an end when she was sold for scrapping on 2 July 1963.

References

NavSource Online: Section Patrol Craft Photo Archive: Kerkenna

World War I cargo ships of the United States
Ships built on the River Clyde
1900 ships
Cargo ships of the United States Navy